For information on all Lamar University sports, see Lamar Cardinals and Lady Cardinals

The 1978–79 Lamar Cardinals basketball team represented Lamar University during the 1978–79 NCAA Division I men's basketball season. The Cardinals were led by third-year head coach Billy Tubbs and played their home games at McDonald Gym in Beaumont, Texas as members of the Southland Conference.  The Cardinals won the regular season conference championship to receive an invitation to the 1979 NCAA Division I men's basketball tournament where they defeated No. 7 seed  in the first round before falling to No. 1 seed and eventual National champion Michigan State and Magic Johnson. Lamar finished the season with a record of 23–9 (9–1 Southland). This season was the first of three straight (and four in five years) NCAA Tournament appearances for the Cardinals.

Roster 
Sources:

Schedule and results
Sources:

|-
!colspan=12 style=| Non-conference regular season

|-
!colspan=12 style=| Southland Conference regular season

|-
!colspan=12 style=| NCAA Division I men's basketball tournament

References

Lamar Cardinals basketball seasons
Lamar
Lamar
Lamar Cardinals basketball
Lamar Cardinals basketball